Marek Jakubiak (born 30 April 1959 in Warsaw) is a Polish politician and brewer. He was a member of the Sejm from 2015 to 2019 and a candidate for President in 2020.

In 2015, he was elected to the Sejm, starting from the Kukiz'15 list in the Płock constituency. He was not re-elected in 2019.

References

External links
 https://konfederacja.net/prawybory/

Kukiz'15 politicians
Living people
Politicians from Warsaw
Members of the Polish Sejm 2015–2019
1959 births
Candidates in the 2020 Polish presidential election